Guajá, or Awá (also Ayaya, Guaxare, Wazaizara), is a geographically isolated Tupi–Guarani language spoken in Brazil. The extinct 'Anambé' recorded by Ehrenreich may have been a distinct language.

References

Tupi–Guarani languages